State Road 41 (NM 41) is a state highway in the US state of New Mexico. NM 41's southern terminus is in the village of Willard at U.S. Route 60 (US 60), and the  northern terminus is in the village of Lamy at US 285.

Major intersections

See also

References

042
Transportation in Torrance County, New Mexico
Transportation in Santa Fe County, New Mexico